Kook or KOOK may refer to:

People
 Kook, a synonym for crank (person), a pejorative term for a person who holds an unshakable belief that most others consider to be ludicrously false
 Kook (surname)
 Kook, a slave prominent in the 1811 German Coast Uprising
 Kook (surfer), a term for a wanna-be surfer of limited skill
Rav Kook, a Zionist rabbi

Media
 KYKK (FM), a radio station (93.5 FM) licensed to serve Junction, Texas, United States, which held the call sign KOOK from 1998 to 2018
 KOOK-TV, a television station now known as KTVQ
 Kook TV, a Saraiki language TV Channel from Pakistan
 Kooks, a 1988–1991 magazine and a 1994 book by Donna Kossy

Entertainment
 KOOK (TV series), a hit music programme on BBC Persian TV
 The Kooks, formed 2004, a British band
 The Kooks (Sweden), a band formed in 1998
 K.O.O.K., an album by German rock band Tocotronic
 "Kooks" (song), a 1971 David Bowie song on Hunky Dory
 The Kook, a 2011 American short film

See also
 Cuckoo (disambiguation)